The West Yellowstone Oregon Shortline Terminus Historic District is a historic district in West Yellowstone, Montana that is ten acres in size and includes 16 structures and buildings. The historic district was built around the terminus of a spur of the Oregon Short Line Railroad, which ran from Idaho Falls, Idaho to West Yellowstone. The completion of the terminus in 1907 in the remote forested area near the west entrance of Yellowstone National Park initiated the planning and development of the town of West Yellowstone, and many of the structures associated with the historical district were built in this time period. The town prospered with the influx of tourism brought by the new railroad line. Seeing the revenue generated from serving tourists passing through West Yellowstone on their way to the nearby national park, the Union Pacific Railroad Company expanded its facilities to include restaurants and lodgings. These buildings, built between 1910 and 1926, are also included in the historic site description. Union Pacific's depot, baggage building, dining lodge, dormitories, and boiler building were designed by noted American architect Gilbert Stanley Underwood. The site was added to the National Register of Historic Places on April 13, 1983.

National Register of Historic Places 
The buildings and structures in the historical site are associated with two periods of significance: the construction of the railroad terminus between 1908 and 1910 and Union Pacific Railroad Company's subsequent construction of accommodations for tourists. Underwood had designed several Union Pacific depots and stations before designing the depot at West Yellowstone. Underwood "combines rustic stylistic features with basic irregular Richardsonian Romanesque massing" in this depot, departing from his previous Beaux Art style. Underwood's later designs for the dining hall and dormitories in West Yellowstone further explored "the possibilities of the naturalistic rustic style in this heavily wooded, remote setting."

The West Yellowstone Oregon Shortline Terminus Historic District was inscribed on to the National Register of Historic Places based on Criterion A ("the property must make a contribution to the major pattern of American history") and Criterion B ("concerns the distinctive characteristics of the building by its architecture and construction, including having great artistic value or being the work of a master").

See also 

 National Register of Historic Places in Gallatin Country, Montana

References

External links

National Register of Historic Places in Gallatin County, Montana
Historic districts on the National Register of Historic Places in Montana
Transportation in Gallatin County, Montana
Rail transportation on the National Register of Historic Places in Montana
Oregon Shortline Terminus Historic District
Oregon Short Line Railroad
1905 establishments in Montana